Streb is a surname. Notable people with the surname include:

 Elizabeth Streb, American choreographer, performer, and teacher of contemporary dance
 Josef Streb, German footballer 
 Marla Streb, American professional mountain bike racer
 Robert Streb, American professional golfer

German-language surnames
Surnames from nicknames